TRevPAR, or total revenue per available room, is a performance metric in the hotel industry. TRevPAR is calculated by dividing the total net revenues of a property by the total available rooms.

TRevPAR is the preferred metric for accountants and hotel owners because it effectively determines the overall financial performance of a property, while RevPAR only takes into account revenue from rooms. TRevPAR is useful for hotels where rooms are not necessarily the largest component of the business. Outlets such as banquet halls also provide a source of revenue for these hotels.

Calculation

 TRevPAR is total net revenue per available room
 Total Revenue is the net revenue generated by the hotel
 Rooms Available is the number of rooms available for sale in the time period.

See also
 RevPAR
 GOPPAR
 Adjusted RevPAR

References

Pricing
Business terms
Revenue
Hospitality management